The Grand Prix Rüebliland is a junior (ages 17-18) multi-day cycling race held annually in the Canton of Aargau, Switzerland. It was part of the UCI Junior World Cup until 2007.

Winners

References

External links

Cycle races in Switzerland
Recurring sporting events established in 1977
1977 establishments in Switzerland